Star Wars: Millennium Falcon – Smugglers Run is a motion simulator attraction, based on the Star Wars film series created by George Lucas. Located in Star Wars: Galaxy's Edge, the attraction opened on May 31, 2019 in Disneyland, and opened on August 29, 2019 in Disney's Hollywood Studios.

Park guests are seated in a 6-passenger motion simulator, themed after the Millennium Falcon. Guests go on an interactive "smuggling mission" with each guest on the attraction being assigned a different crew role. The story is set between the films The Last Jedi (2017) and The Rise of Skywalker (2019).

History 
At the Disney D23 Expo in 2015, Disney first announced the creation of a Star Wars-themed land coming to Disneyland and Disney's Hollywood Studios. In 2017, Disney announced that the new Star Wars-themed land would be called Star Wars: Galaxy's Edge and it would hold two new attractions. Millennium Falcon: Smuggler's Run wasn't officially announced until 2018.

Star Wars: Galaxy's Edge and Millennium Falcon: Smuggler's Run first opened at Disneyland on May 31, 2019 and the second opened at Disney's Hollywood Studios on August 29, 2019.

Star Wars: Millennium Falcon – Smugglers Run had wait times ranging from 30 to 60 minutes upon opening day. The ride benefited from having four slowly rotating attraction turntables. Each turntable had multiple Millennium Falcon cockpits. That meant that the downtime was registered if all four turntables of the flight simulator failed simultaneously.

Ride experience

Queue 
Smuggler's Run is located in the center of Black Spire Outpost at the entrance to Ohnaka Transport Solutions. The queue begins outside, wrapping around behind a life-size Millennium Falcon parked outside. The queue continues through an engine room/mechanic shop which then leads to the command center where Audio-Animatronics of Hondo Ohnaka and R5-P8 explain what the ride is about. If the animatronic of Ohnaka is not working, Ohnaka will instead appear on the left-hand television screen and acknowledge and apologize about the remote communication before explaining what the ride is about. R5-P8, a yellow, red and white R5 unit assassin astromech droid, is one of Hondo's guards. Both characters were first seen in Star Wars: The Clone Wars; as in the series, the animatronic of Hondo is voiced by Jim Cummings. Each player can have one of three jobs—pilot, gunner, or engineer. Guests are grouped into six riders (two of each job) and given a color which is then called when ready to board. While riders wait for their color to be called, they get to explore the inside of the Millennium Falcon. Once their group color is called, riders walk down the corridors of the Millennium Falcon to the flight deck where the ride begins.

Ride 
Riders begin their ride experience by loading into the cockpit of the Millennium Falcon. The two pilots sit in the front row–the left side moves the ship left and right, and the right side moves the ship up and down. The next row holds the gunners who press buttons to shoot down enemies and obstacles in the way. The back row seats the two engineers who work to repair the ship during the flight.

Similar to Epcot's Mission: SPACE, Smugglers Run is an interactive ride, with every guest having a role in the mission. Lasting four and a half minutes, the ride takes the guests on a mission led by Hondo Ohnaka and R5-P8 to steal precious cargo from  the First Order TIE fighters. How well each rider performs determines the success of the mission. Furthermore, any "damage" afflicted to the ship during the run will affect the lighting conditions in the exit corridor.

The ride is made up of several simulators mounted on a turntable that rotates periodically. Guests that work quicker are given more to do (like capturing additional cargo or navigating through an asteroid field) and receive longer messages from Hondo while they wait for their turn to exit.

See also
 Avatar Flight of Passage
Star Tours – The Adventures Continue
 Star Wars: Rise of the Resistance
 Space Mountain
 Soarin'
 Peter Pan's Flight

References

Further reading

External links
 Disneyland Official Website
 Disney's Hollywood Studios Official Website

Amusement rides introduced in 2019
Disney's Hollywood Studios
Disneyland
Millennium Falcon - Smugglers Run
Amusement rides based on film franchises
Walt Disney Parks and Resorts attractions
Audio-Animatronic attractions
Millennium Falcon - Smugglers Run
Simulator rides
2019 establishments in Florida
2019 establishments in California